Eva Elisabet Dahlbeck (8 March 1920 – 8 February 2008) was a Swedish stage, film, and television actress. She received a Cannes Film Festival Award for Best Actress for her performance in the film Brink of Life (1958). Dahlbeck retired from acting in 1970 and became an author.

Biography
Eva Dahlbeck was born in Saltsjö-Duvnäs near Stockholm.  She attended the prestigious Royal Dramatic Training Academy from 1941 to 1944, and acted on the Theatre's stage from 1944 to 1964. She made her film debut in the role of Botilla in Ride Tonight! (Rid i natt!, 1942).

Among her roles in Swedish films were the shrewd celebrity reporter Vivi in Love Goes Up and Down (Kärlek och störtlopp, 1946), the working-class mother Rya-Rya in the drama Only a Mother (Bara en mor, 1949); Mrs. Larsson, the warmhearted mother of seven in the popular children's film Kastrullresan (1950), and the young primary school teacher in Gustaf Molander's Trots (1952), a film with a screenplay by Vilgot Sjöman.  In the mid-1950s Dahlbeck was one of Sweden's most popular and successful actresses. She became internationally known for her strong female leads in a number of Ingmar Bergman's films, in particular his comedies Secrets of Women (1952), A Lesson in Love (1954) and Smiles of a Summer Night (1955). In 1965 she won the award for Best Actress at the 2nd Guldbagge Awards for her role in the film The Cats (Kattorna, 1965).

In the 1960s, Dahlbeck moved away from acting as she started to write. She retired from the stage in 1964 and made her final appearance on screen in the Danish film Tintomara (1970). She published several novels and poems in her native Sweden, and wrote the screenplay for Arne Mattsson's dark film Yngsjömordet (The Yngsjö murder) in 1966.

Dahlbeck married Sven Lampell, an air force officer, in 1944. The couple had two children. She lived out the last years of her life in Hässelby Villastad, Stockholm, where she died at age 87.

Awards
 1961 - Eugene O'Neill Award for her stage work.

Filmography

 Only a Woman (1941) as Guest at the masquerade 
 The Talk of the Town (1941) as Dancing woman 
 Ride Tonight! (1942) as Botilla
 Count Only the Happy Moments (1944) as Hedvig
 Oss tjuvar emellan eller En burk ananas (1945) as Astrid 
 Black Roses (1945) as Per Bergström's wife
 The Serious Game (1945) as Dagmar Randel
 Brita in the Merchant's House (1946) as Brita
 Love Goes Up and Down (1946) as Vivi Boström
 Meeting in the Night (1946) as Marit
 The Key and the Ring (1947) as Eva Berg
 Two Women (1947) as Sonja Bergman
 The People of Simlang Valley (1947) as Ingrid Folkesson
 Each to His Own Way (1948) as Karin Brofeldt
 Lars Hård (1948) as Inga
Girl from the Mountain Village (1948) as Isa
 Eva (1948) as Susanne
 Woman in White (1949) as Solveig Rygård
 Only a Mother (1949) as Maria, aka Rya-Rya
  Fiancée for Hire (1950) as Margit Berg
 Jack of Hearts (1950) as Gun Lovén
 The Saucepan Journey (1950) as Mamma Larsson
 In the Arms of the Sea (1951) as  Lucie
 Sköna Helena (1951) as Helena
 Carson City  (1952) as Gun
 U-Boat 39 (1952) as Maria Friberg
 Defiance (1952) as Teacher
 Secrets of Women (1952) as  Karin
 Barabbas (1953) as The Mother
 The Shadow (1953) as Vivianne
 The Village (1953) as Wanda Piwonska
 House of Women (1953) as Isa
 The Chieftain of Göinge (1953) as Kristina Ulfstand
Foreign Intrigue (1953-1955, TV Series) as Barbara Vale / Nina Richter / Hilda / Nurse
A Lesson in Love (1954) as Marianne Erneman
 Voyage in the Night (1955) as Birgitta Lundberg
 Dreams (1955) as Susanne
 Paradise (1955) as Ulla Karlsson
 Smiles of a Summer Night (1955) as Desiree Armfeldt
 Tarps Elin (1956) as Elin Tarp
 Last Pair Out (1956) as Susanna Dahlin
 Encounters in the Twilight (1957) as Irma Sköld
 Summer Place Wanted (1957) as Ingeborg Dahlström
 Brink of Life (1958) as Stina Andersson
 A Matter of Morals (1960) as Eva Walderman
 Kärlekens decimaler (1960) as Astrid
 Tre önskningar (1960) as Adèle Linton
 Ticket to Paradise (1962) as Rita Carol
 The Counterfeit Traitor (1962) as  Ingrid Erickson
 All These Women (1964) as Adelaide
 Loving Couples (1964) as Marta Alleus
 Morianna (1965) as  Anna Vade
The Cats (1965) as Michele Quellec
 Woman of Darkness (1966) as Screenwriter
 Hagbard and Signe (1967) as  The Queen
 People Meet and Sweet Music Fills the Heart (1967) as Devah Sørensen
 Markurells i Wadköping (1968-1969,TV Mini-Series) as Fru Markurell
 A Day at the Beach (1970) as  Cafe Proprietress
Tintomara (1970) as Baroness (final film role)

Novels

1964: Hem till kaos ("Home To Chaos")
1965: Sista spegeln: preludier ("The Last Mirror: Preludes")
1966: Den sjunde natten: detaljer (The Seventh Night: Details")
1967: Domen ("The Verdict")
1972: Med seende ögon ("With Eyes That See")
1974: Hjärtslagen ("The Heartbeats")
1976: Saknadens dal
1979: Maktspråket ("The Language of Power")
1980: I våra tomma rum ("In Our Empty Rooms")
1988: Serveto och den eviga elden ("Serveto and the Eternal Flame")
1991: Vapenhandlarens död: ett reportage från insidan ("The Armsdealer's Death: An Inside Story")
1996: På kärlekens villkor: en vandring i ett laglöst land
1999: Sökarljus ("Searching Lights")

References

Notes

Svenskfilmdatabas.se (Swedish Film Database)

Further reading

External links

1920 births
2008 deaths
20th-century Swedish novelists
20th-century Swedish women writers
Swedish film actresses
Swedish women novelists
Best Actress Guldbagge Award winners
Cannes Film Festival Award for Best Actress winners
Eugene O'Neill Award winners